Doncaster–Eltham Road is a major arterial road in the north-eastern suburbs of Melbourne, Victoria, Australia. This name is not widely known to most drivers, as the entire allocation is still best known as by the names of its constituent parts: Fitzsimons Lane and Williamsons Road. This article will deal with the entire length of the corridor for sake of completion, as well to avoid confusion between declarations.

The road is a major transportation link, with Fitzsimons Lane being one of the only major river crossings of the Yarra River in the eastern suburbs and carries upwards of 50,000 vehicles each day.

Route
Fitzsimons Lane begins at the intersection with Main Road just north of the Yarra River in Eltham. After the Yarra River, it gains an extra lane southbound (previously used as a bus lane but opened up to all traffic to improve traffic flow) and also provides access to the nearby Westerfolds Park. To the eastern side just after the Yarra River crossing is the iconic structure officially known as the 'River Peel', but far more commonly known to locals as 'The Apple Peel'. This structure was previously part of the roundabout intersection with Porter Street but since 2022 has been moved to its current location, due to the elimination of the roundabout as part of the Fitzsimons Lane upgrades. Travelling further south the road intersects with Porter Street which provides access to Templestowe shops in the west and Warrandyte in the east, following the Yarra Scenic Drive (Tourist Route 2).

South of the Porter Street intersection, the road is known as Williamsons Road and carries six lanes of traffic until Foote Street, where it again reduces to four lanes until the roads southern terminus (although the King Street intersection briefly increases to six lanes on approaches to intersection). Between Foote Street and King Street, the road climbs, descends then climbs a steep grade, which often causes congestion in peak hour. Doncaster–Eltham Road then terminates at the intersection with Manningham Road, which continues south past Westfield Doncaster but is still locally known as Williamsons Road.

History
Previous to the construction of the Fitzsimons Lane bridge, nearby existing crossings of the Yarra River were Banksia Street in Heidelberg, or Warrandyte Bridge in Warrandyte; construction of this bridge shortened a  journey between Eltham and Templestowe to just  once completed. The Country Roads Board (later VicRoads) completed reinforced concrete piers and abutments for a bridge over the Yarra River, connecting Fitzsimons Lane on the southern bank to Main Road on the northern bank, in the 1959/60 financial year, with a contract let for the fabrication of the bridge's steel girders. Williamsons Road was extended further north from Foote Street to Porter Street, to link directly with Fitzsimons Lane and bypass the traffic route through Templestowe at the time (along Porter and Anderson Streets and Serpells Road), in the mid-1970s. The bridge was duplicated in December 1991, with duplication of the road between Porter Street and Rosehill Road for a total cost of $6.2 million.

Fitzsimons Lane was signed as Metropolitan Route 48 between Eltham and Doncaster in 1965, originally following the deviation through Templestowe and then south along Williamsons Road to the intersection with Manningham Road; this was re-routed away from Templestowe when the Williamsons Road extension opened in the mid-1970s. Metropolitan Route 48 was replaced along the entire corridor by Metropolitan Route 47 in 1989. In 2022 with the completion of major works of the Fitzsimons Lane upgrades, B37 has replaced Metropolitan Route 47 between Main Road and Foote Street.

The Country Roads Board (later VicRoads) declared Doncaster–Eltham Road a Main Road in June 1983, from Eltham-Yarra Glen Road (today Main Road) in Eltham to Manningham Road in Doncaster; all roads were known (and signposted) as their constituent parts.

The passing of the Road Management Act 2004 granted the responsibility of overall management and development of Victoria's major arterial roads to VicRoads: in 2004, VicRoads declared Doncaster-Eltham Road (Arterial #5901) from Eltham-Yarra Glen Road (today Main Road) in Eltham to Manningham Road in Doncaster; as before, all roads are known (and signposted) as their constituent parts.

Between 2021-2023 the road received major upgrades, in an effort to reduce bottlenecks at some key intersections where cars would often queue for kilometres. The Fitzsimons Lane Upgrade replaced the roundabouts at Main Road and Porter Street with traffic lights, as well as upgrading the existing Foote Street intersection and adding an extra lane between Porter Street and Foote Street. Major construction was completed in 2022 with minor works continuing into 2023.

Major intersections

References 

Highways and freeways in Melbourne
Transport in the City of Manningham
Transport in the Shire of Nillumbik
Transport in the City of Banyule
Bridges in Melbourne
Buildings and structures in the City of Manningham
Buildings and structures in the Shire of Nillumbik